Carlo Gartner (April 3, 1922 – June 10, 2013) was an Italian alpine skier who competed in the 1948 Winter Olympics and in the 1952 Winter Olympics.
He was born in Sterzing. In 1948 he finished sixth in the alpine skiing downhill competition. Four years later he finished eighth in the 1952 downhill event and 18th in the giant slalom competition.

References

External links
 

1922 births
2013 deaths
Germanophone Italian people
Sportspeople from Sterzing
Italian male alpine skiers
Olympic alpine skiers of Italy
Alpine skiers at the 1948 Winter Olympics
Alpine skiers at the 1952 Winter Olympics
Italian alpine skiing coaches